Suzanne Goldish, sometimes credited as Suzy Goldish, is an American ADR voice director, audio engineer, photographer and voice actress.

Career
Goldish worked on the properties of 4Kids Entertainment; she was the ADR engineer for the Pokémon TV series. Goldish is also known as the voice of Jasmine from the popular Yugioh GX series.

Goldish has gained extensive experience and honed her kids' entertainment chops through years in Sesame Workshop's Interactive Technologies group, as well as the Educate Products/Hooked on Phonics Product Development group in New York City. She is also an accomplished photographer; she holds a master's degree in photography at the NYU. Additionally, Suzanne also teaches photography classes in the Los Angeles area.

She currently resides in Los Angeles, California and works for Studiopolis. Goldish has directed the Viz Sailor Moon dub, Tiger and Bunny The Movie: The Rising, and the K: Missing Kings movie.

Voice roles

Anime/Animation
 Sonic X - Christopher Thorndyke (young)
 Winx Club (4Kids edit) - Additional voices
 Pokémon - Additional voices
 Pokémon Chronicles - Nick (young)
 Yu-Gi-Oh! GX - Jasmine
 Teenage Mutant Ninja Turtles - Random child, additional voices
 Sailor Moon Crystal - Yumiko, Additional Voices

Video games
 L.A. Noire - Judy Lynn

Production credits
 Bleach - Recording engineer, Voice Director
 Bleach: The Hell Verse - Voice Director
 Blur - Recording engineer
 Digimon Fusion - ADR Mixing
 Dino Time - ADR Editor
 F-Zero: GP Legend - Recording Engineer
 Final Fantasy XIII-2 - Dialogue Editor, Recording engineer
 Hulk and the Agents of S.M.A.S.H. - Foley Artist
 K - Voice Director
 Kekkaishi - Casting & Voice Director
 Lost Planet 2 - Recording engineer
 Magical Doremi - ADR Engineer
 Marvel Heroes - Recording engineer
 NFL Rush Zone - ADR Mixer
 Naruto Shippuden - Recording engineer
 One Piece (4Kids Dub) - Sound Design
 Pokémon: Destiny Deoxys - ADR Editor
 Pokémon Advance - ADR Engineer
 Randy Cunningham: 9th Grade Ninja - ADR Mixer
 Red Dead Redemption - Recording Engineer
 Sailor Moon - Recording Engineer, Voice Director (Viz Media dub)
 Sonic X - Recording Engineer
 Sonic Colors - Recording Engineer
 Sonic Free Riders - Dialogue Editor, Recording Engineer
 Sonic Generations - Dialogue Editor, Recording Engineer
 Sonic Boom: Rise of Lyric - Dialogue Editor
 The Super Hero Squad Show - Dialogue Editor
 Stitch! - Recording Engineer
 Tiger & Bunny - Recording Engineer, Voice Director
 Mew Mew Power - Sound Design
 Transformers: Prime - Dialogue Editor
 Transformers: Robots in Disguise - Dialogue Recordist
 Valkyria Chronicles II - Sound Engineer
 Vanquish - Recording engineer
 Yu-Gi-Oh! - ADR Engineer

References

External links
 
 
 Suzanne Goldish's official website

Living people
Year of birth missing (living people)
American voice actresses
American voice directors
American photographers
20th-century American actresses
21st-century American actresses
21st-century American women photographers
21st-century American photographers